Singles club may refer to:

A Dance club for single adults
A Dating service for single adults
Singles Club (EP), an EP released by Paramore
Singles Club (Blue Dog Records), a "record a month" club by Blue Dog Records
Sub Pop Singles Club, a subscription service by Sub Pop Records